Minkiri is a village and seat of the commune of Hanzakoma in the Cercle of Gourma-Rharous in the Tombouctou Region of Mali. The village lies on the right bank of the River Niger upstream of Gourma-Rharous.

References

Populated places in Tombouctou Region